The 1955–56 season was the fifty-fourth season in which Dundee competed at a Scottish national level, playing in Division One, where the club would finish in 13th place. Dundee would also compete in both the Scottish Cup and the Scottish League Cup. They would be knocked out of the group stages of the League Cup, and would be defeated by Rangers in the 6th round of the Scottish Cup.

Scottish Division One 

Statistics provided by Dee Archive.

League table

Scottish League Cup 

Statistics provided by Dee Archive.

Group 1

Group 1 table

Scottish Cup 

Statistics provided by Dee Archive.

Player Statistics 
Statistics provided by Dee Archive

|}

See also 

 List of Dundee F.C. seasons

References

External links 

 1955-56 Dundee season on Fitbastats

Dundee F.C. seasons
Dundee